The Veronika Award is a literary award in Slovenia awarded each year for the best Slovene poetry collection of the year. It has been bestowed since 1997 by the Municipality of Celje at the Veronika Festival that takes place at Celje Castle. The festival and the award are named after Veronika of Desenice, wife of Frederick II, Count of Celje, accused of witchcraft, incarcerated in Ojstrica Castle and murdered in around 1425. The winner receives a financial award. Since 2005 a separate Poetry Gold Medal is bestowed on a poet for their life achievement that has contributed to the richness of Slovene poetry, language and culture.

Veronika Award laureates

Poetry Gold Medal recipients 
 2005 - Ciril Zlobec
 2006 - Tone Pavček
 2007 - Kajetan Kovič
 2008 - Miroslav Košuta
 2009 - Ivan Minatti
 2010 - Neža Maurer
 2011 - Veno Taufer
 2012 - Svetlana Makarovič
 2013 - Niko Grafenauer
 2014 - Tone Kuntner
 2015 - Gustav Januš
 2016 - Marko Kravos
 2017 - Andrej Brvar

References

External links
 Former Veronika Award site
 Official Veronika Award site

 
Slovenian literary awards
Awards established in 1997